Irving Howard Saypol (September 3, 1905 – June 30, 1977) was a United States attorney for the Southern District of New York and New York Supreme Court Justice. He was involved in several high-profile Communist prosecutions, including the Alger Hiss, William Remington, Abraham Brothman, and Julius and Ethel Rosenberg cases.

Biography
He was born to a Jewish family on September 3, 1905, on the Lower East Side of Manhattan, New York City to Louis and Michakin Saypol.

While attending night classes at Brooklyn Law School, from which he graduated in 1927, he married Adele B. Kaplan in September 1925. Their son, Ronald Saypol, served as CEO of Lionel Corporation from 1968 to 1982. He was admitted to the bar in 1928.

Saypol quickly advanced in the United States Attorney's Office. He became the United States Attorney for the Southern District of New York. Irving Saypol led the prosecution of several members of the Communist Party of the United States (CPUSA) including Eugene Dennis, William Z. Foster, John Gates, Robert G. Thompson, Gus Hall, William Remington, Abraham Brothman and Miriam Moskowitz.  As a result of these prosecutions Saypol was described by Time as "the nation's number one legal hunter of top communists."

From 1950 to 1951 he was Chief Prosecutor for the federal government in the espionage case against Julius and Ethel Rosenberg and Morton Sobell. He gained a reputation as an efficient prosecutor of Communists.

Saypol served on the New York Supreme Court from 1952 until 1968. Saypol was one of 14 judges indicted by a controversial special prosecutor who was appointed to investigate police corruption but instead pursued the judiciary.  Anthony Lewis, The Zeal of Maurice Nadjari, New York Times, March 28, 1976. None of the prosecutions were successful. In Saypol's case the court found that the allegation of the $125 bribery alleged in the indictment was unsubstantiated. The opinion states: "Taken as a whole, the evidence not only does not establish a legal basis for a charge of bribery, but clearly confirms that there was no bribe." (Decision of  Justice Leonard H. Sandler, People v. Sandler, Indictment No. 1875/76, 87/76, p. 9.

In 1975 Saypol ruled against the landmark designation for Grand Central Terminal in New York City removing legal barriers to the construction of a 59-story office tower on top of the terminal.

Saypol died from cancer on June 30, 1977 at his home at  152 East 94th Street in Manhattan, New York City.

References

Sources
The Political Graveyard: Index to Politicians: Sawyers to Saywell
Biographies of Participants in the Rosenbergs Trial

1905 births
1977 deaths
20th-century American Jews
Julius and Ethel Rosenberg
New York (state) lawyers
People from the Lower East Side
Brooklyn Law School alumni
United States Attorneys for the Southern District of New York
New York Supreme Court Justices
20th-century American lawyers